is a role-playing video game developed and published by Sega. It was released for the Sega Genesis in Japan in April 1990 and worldwide the following year. It is the third game in the original Phantasy Star series, and is a distant sequel to the previous games. However, gameplay is similar to the previous games, with turn-based combat and random encounters. Players explore various overworld maps and dungeons in order to progress through the game. It was later re-released on the Virtual Console and on retro collections such as the Phantasy Star Collection, Sega Genesis Collection, and Sonic's Ultimate Genesis Collection.

Gameplay 

Phantasy Star III mostly follows the traditional roleplaying game formula seen throughout the series, with the exploration of several 2-D worlds, character recruitment, and random enemy encounters using a turn-based battle system. Unlike previous games, the "technique" magic system plays a somewhat diminished role in combat. New features in the combat system include the auto-battle feature and the icon-based menu system.

The feature that mostly separates Phantasy Star III, however, is that the story spans three generations of characters. At critical points throughout the game, the main character is given the option of marrying one of two women he has encountered during his travels. This choice determines the new main character of the next generation—the child (or children) of the previous lead. The choice also affects the gameplay, as the main character may be Orakian or a mix of Layan and Orakian, which differ in their ability to use techniques and their level of proficiency with them. Two paths in the second generation in turn lead to four paths in the third and final generation, and depending on which of the four main characters is played, the ending will vary.

Plot 

A thousand years before the start of the game, two factions — one led by the swordsman Orakio, the other by the sorceress Laya — were engaged in a bitter conflict. An attempt at peace was made when the two leaders met for an armistice, but soon afterwards they both mysteriously vanished. This placed the two factions in a precarious situation, as each blamed the other for their leader's disappearance. All communication between the Orakians and Layans was suspended, travel between their respective worlds was prohibited, and the two groups teetered on the brink of war.

Players take control of Rhys, Crown Prince of the Orakian kingdom of Landen, on the day of his wedding to Maia, a mysterious amnesiac who washed up on Landen's shore two months earlier.

During the ceremony, a dragon (identified as a Layan) suddenly appears and snatches Maia, in what seems to be an overt escalation of the Layan-Orakian conflict. During Rhys's search for Maia, he recruits various characters to his cause. Ultimately, it is revealed that Maia herself is Layan, Princess of the kingdom of Cille, and that her kidnapping was actually a rescue attempt by her people, who believed she had been stolen from them by the "hostile" Orakians.

It is later revealed in-game that both factions are the descendants of survivors from planet Palm of the Algo System — which was destroyed during the events of the previous game — and that their different kingdoms are sections of a massive colonization-spaceship.

After three generations, both factions mix, and their descendants discover that all the conflicts among the different kingdoms were caused by the Dark Force, the main antagonist of the previous games, which is defeated in a final decisive battle that actually takes place 1,000 years after the events from the next game in the series.

Development 
The game was developed and published by Sega for the Sega Genesis, where it first released in Japan in April 1990 and in North America in July 1991. Producer Kazunari Tsukamoto described Phantasy Star III as being similar to a collection of side stories when compared to the connected narrative of its predecessor and the sequel Phantasy Star IV: The End of the Millennium. This and its altered graphic style was due to the team being different from earlier Phantasy Star entries. Hirondo Saiki acted as game designer. The game's multiple endings proved difficult to implement due to data storage limitations. The branching narrative and gameplay paths were added to set the game apart from other role-playing games (RPGs) due to the crowded market at the time. The game was the first time designers and programmers came together as a team rather than separate units, but Saiki became fatigued during development of the game's later stages due to being sole designer. In order to realise the planned scale of the world, several portions of the narrative needed to be cut. Character designs and the cover art were done by Saru Miya, who remembered experiencing great hardships with the project, describing it as something which she considered a "home-spun" project. The music for Phantasy Star III was composed by Izuho Numata, who had only been at Sega for two years. She later claimed that the project was challenging due to her lack of experience with composing for RPGs.

Reception

Contemporary

Phantasy Star III received positive reviews upon release. Praise was given to Phantasy Star III for its unique "generational" gameplay and characters.

Computer Gaming World in 1991 praised the game's graphics and its "plenty of plot twists and turns." The magazine concluded that it was "a rewarding epic tale which should be told on every Genesis system." The game was reviewed that year in Dragon #176 by Hartley, Patricia, and Kirk Lesser in "The Role of Computers" column. The reviewers gave the game 4 out of 5 stars. They noted that they "didn't like it as much as Phantasy Star II" but still praised Phantasy Star III for being "creative in many ways," including the choices of whom to marry, the different possible endings, and the "longer play life" that this allows. Electronic Gaming Monthly gave Phantasy Star III one 7, two 8s, and one 9, with reviewer Martin Alessi stating that the game "blows away the previous games" in the series.

The only downside according to MegaTech magazine was that "it costs a massive £50!"

Retrospective

Retrospectively, it maintains above average ratings, with an overall score of 68% on the aggregate site GameRankings based on retrospective reviews published online in the 2000s. Some critics thought it was just too "different" in style from its peers. Critics cite the only subtle differences between the endings, lower quality battle animations, and the fact that it did not resolve the perceived cliffhanger ending of Phantasy Star II.

Mega placed the game at #12 in their Top Mega Drive Games of All Time list in 1992. Nintendo Power named it the series' "lackluster third installment" in 2009 and noted that series co-creator Rieko Kodama did not work on it.

The game's icon-based menu system inspired a similar menu system in 1991's Shining in the Darkness.

References 

1990 video games
Generation ships in fiction
Phantasy Star video games
Role-playing video games
Sega video games
Sega Genesis games
Video game sequels
Virtual Console games
Windows games
Video games developed in Japan
Fiction set around Algol